Clifford George Evans  (17 February 1912 – 9 June 1985) was a Welsh actor.

During the summer of 1934 Evans appeared in A Midsummer Night's Dream at the Open Air Theatre in London. He played many parts in British films of the 1930s, then during the Second World War was a conscientious objector, serving in the Non-Combatant Corps. He continued to act during the war and starred in the films The Foreman Went to France (1942) and The Flemish Farm (1943).

After the war, Evans's best known film roles were for Hammer Studios: he played Don Alfredo Carledo in The Curse of the Werewolf (1961) and Professor Zimmer, an often inebriated vampire-hunter, in Kiss of the Vampire (1963). His last screen role was in Granada TV's A Land of Ice Cream in 1985.

On television, Evans appeared with George Woodbridge and Tim Turner in the 15-episode series Stryker of the Yard (1957). Between 1965 and 1969, he played a major role in the TV boardroom drama The Power Game, playing building tycoon Caswell Bligh. He is also among several British actors to play the character of Number Two in The Prisoner ("Do Not Forsake Me Oh My Darling", 1967). He also appeared in three episodes of The Avengers, in The Champions, The Saint, and Randall and Hopkirk (Deceased) ("When did You Start to Stop Seeing Things?", 1969). The following year, he played Sir Iain Dalzell, a leading character in the BBC TV series Codename (1970).

He married Hermione Hannen, who was an actress.

Partial filmography

 The River House Mystery (1935) – Ivan
 Ourselves Alone (1936) – Commandant Connolly
 Calling the Tune (1936) – Peter Mallory
 The Tenth Man (1936) – Ford
 The Mutiny of the Elsinore (1937) – Bert Rhyne
 Under Secret Orders (1937) – Rene Condoyan
 13 Men and a Gun (1938) – Jorg
 Luck of the Navy (1938) – Lieut. Peel
 His Brother's Keeper (1940) – Jack Cornell
 At the Villa Rose (1940) – Tace
 The Proud Valley (1940) – Seth Jones
 The House of the Arrow (1940) – Maurice Thevenet
 Freedom Radio (1941) – Dressler
 Fingers (1941) – Fingers
 Love on the Dole (1941) – Larry Meath
 Penn of Pennsylvania (1942) – William Penn
 The Foreman Went to France (1942) – Fred Carrick, the foreman
 Suspected Person (1942) – Jim Raynor
 The Saint Meets the Tiger (1943) – Tidemarsh / The Tiger
 The Flemish Farm (1943) – Jean Duclos
 The Silver Darlings (1947) – Roddie
 While I Live (1947) – Peter
 The Twenty Questions Murder Mystery (1950) – Tom Harmon
 Escape Route (1952) – Michael Grand
 The Accused (1953) – Dan Anderson
 Valley of Song (1953) – Geraint Llewellyn
 The Straw Man (1953) – Jeff Howard
 Stryker of the Yard (1953) – Inspector Stryker
 Solution by Phone (1954) – Richard Hanborough
 The Red Dress (1954) – Sam Pugh (segment "Red Dress' story)
 Companions in Crime (1954) – Inspector Stryker
 The Gilded Cage (1955) – Ken Aimes
 Passport to Treason (1956) – Orlando Syms
 Face in the Night (1957) – Inspector Ford
 At the Stroke of Nine (1957) – Inspector Hudgell
 The Heart Within (1957) – Matthew Johnson
 Violent Playground (1958) – Heaven
 SOS Pacific (1959) – Petersen
 The Curse of the Werewolf (1961) – Alfredo
 Kiss of the Vampire (1963) – Professor Zimmer
 The Long Ships (1964) – King Harald
 A Twist of Sand (1968) – Admiral Tringham
 One Brief Summer (1971) – Mark Stevens

References

External links

1912 births
1985 deaths
People from Caerphilly
British conscientious objectors
Personnel of the Non-Combatant Corps
Welsh male film actors
Welsh male television actors
20th-century Welsh male actors
Alumni of RADA
Welsh military personnel